The 2005 South American Championships in Athletics were held at the Estadio Pascual Guerrero in Cali, Colombia from July 21 to July 24, 2005.  Detailed day-by-day reports can be found on the IAAF website.

Medal summary

Men's events

Women's events

Medal table

See also
2005 in athletics (track and field)

References

External links
 Men Results – GBR Athletics
 Women Results – GBR Athletics
  (archived)

South American
South American Championships in Athletics
International athletics competitions hosted by Colombia
South American
2005 in South American sport
July 2005 sports events in South America